Sphodrini is a tribe of ground beetles in the family Carabidae. There are more than 30 genera and at least 910 described species in Sphodrini.

See also
For a list of Sphodrini genera, see Platyninae.

References

Harpalinae
Articles created by Qbugbot